Barış Yarkadaş, (born 2 August 1974) is a Turkish journalist, politician and a writer. He's a member and lawmaker of the Republican People's Party and an incumbent member of parliament representing a division in the first electoral district of Istanbul.

Personal life 
Baris Yarkadas, son of Zülfiye and Rasim Yarkadaş, was born on 2 August 1974 in Susuz, Kars. Yarkadaş moved to Istanbul in 1988 and graduated from Anadolu University. He entered into journalism during his university years and then worked in many television programs as a journalist. He is also a member of the Turkish Journalists' Association.

Politics 
Yarkadas won two consecutive elections in June 2015 and November 2015 (snap election) as a member of parliament of a division in the first electoral district of Istanbul.

Publications 
Hepsi Yaralar Sonuncusu Öldürür (2004) 
Aksaray'ın Sırları (2015)

References

External links

1974 births
Members of the 25th Parliament of Turkey
Members of the 26th Parliament of Turkey
Turkish journalists
Living people